Carmel Market (Shuk HaCarmel) is an outdoor marketplace in Tel Aviv, Israel.

History
The Carmel market was established in the 1920s. It is bordered by Allenby Street and Magen David Square and is principally located along Carmel Street, but has expanded over time to streets such as Nahalat Binyamin Street.

The market is open every day of the week, except Shabbat (Saturday), and sells mostly food but also a variety of items such as home accessories, and flowers. Tuesdays and Fridays are the signature days at the market as several independent artists and vendors sell unique crafts, art, and jewelry along Nahalat Binyamin Street.

References

See also
Mahane Yehuda Market
Carmel Market bombing

Food markets
Retail markets in Israel
Buildings and structures in Tel Aviv